INS Sutlej (J17) is a hydrographic survey ship of the  in the Indian Navy, under the Southern Naval Command. Like other ships of the same class, this ship is also equipped with an Operating Theater and associated equipment needed to attend to medical emergencies at sea.

Ship history
Built by Goa Shipyard Limited and commissioned into the Naval service at Kochi naval base. Sutlej is equipped with a range of surveying, navigational and communication systems. The next-generation surveying systems provided on board include the multi-beam swath echo sounding system, differential global positioning system, motion sensors, sea gravimeter, magnetometer oceanographic sensors, side scan sonars and an automated data logging system. These are designed to meet the stringent international/ISO 9002 digital survey accuracy standards required for the production of electronic navigation charts and publications.

Sutlej is powered by two diesel engines and is capable of sustained speeds. The ship's multi-role capability places her in the league of the most versatile survey vessels in the world. It can undertake a variety of tasks under trying conditions.

Survey work
INS Sutlej in 2016 completed joint Hydrographic Survey of Mkoani harbour of Tanzania with the objective to prepare a navigational chart of the harbour that will be used by the port authorities and ships for navigation. In the aftermath of the 2004 tsunami the ship was deployed to Sri Lanka to conduct hydrographic survey off the coast of Galle and Colombo harbours on request of Sri Lankan authorities. Ship completed Medium Refit from 2010–12  at Cochin Shipyard Ltd. On completion of refit she has undertaken Hydrographic Surveys of Porbandar, Kandla, Kerala Coast and Lakshadweep Islands. Alongside special meteorological, geo physical, tidal and tidal stream observations were carried out at Azhikkal, Kannur, Vadakara (Murat), Beypore and Kadalundi river mouth at the request of an external agency.

Relief work
The ships provided relief assistance in Sri Lanka in not just government held but also LTTE held rebel areas. In mid 2016 Sutlej, was one of two Indian Navy ships sent to Colombo from Southern Naval Command in Kochi, the other being the patrol vessel  to help in relief work after Cyclone Roanu. In late 2016 Sutlej, provided relief assistance to the stricken fishing vessel
Judan with seven crew on board by towing them to the Kanyakumari port. The ship was also deployed in the aftermath of Gujarat earthquake at Kandla port to treat the injured.

References

External links

 Report on archaeological dives 

1991 ships
Sandhayak-class survey ships
Ships built in India